Philip Ashley Taylor Dawson (born 11 January 1982), known as Ashley Taylor Dawson, is an English actor and singer. He is known for portraying the role of Darren Osborne in the Channel 4 soap opera Hollyoaks, as well as being a member of the pop group allSTARS*.

Early life
Born in Manchester, Dawson grew up in Wilmslow. He attended Ashdene Primary School and Altrincham Grammar School for Boys and joined local drama group Scamps at a young age. He is the brother of singer and guitarist Catherine Taylor-Dawson.

Career
Dawson has played the role of Darren Osborne in Hollyoaks since 1999. Actor Adam Booth originally played the part before leaving in 1997. The character rejoined Hollyoaks in 1999 when Dawson secured the part. Dawson joined Hollyoaks when he was 17 years old after getting his big break with the National Youth Theatre. Since then he has appeared in Hollyoaks spinoffs such as Hollyoaks Later and Tom's Life. He went on to secure the part of Darren following an audition, but soon after left in 2000 to join ALLSTARS*. Dawson re-joined the show in August 2003 after AllSTARS* split up. On playing the part Dawson said "I love playing the bad lad. He's my alter ego".

Dawson was a member of the UK pop band allSTARS*. His college best friend, Sam Bloom, called him up for an audition and invited him over. Byrne Blood Productions (Steps, A1), the management company at that time, was surprised to find that the actor could also dance and sing. Dawson eventually made it in, getting accepted and rising to fame. Dawson and Bloom also shared a flat together. Other than performing, he also appeared in allSTARS*' accompanying CITV television show, STARStreet*. Dawson was featured in other shows as well. He performed with the band on 80s Mania in 2001, and was next seen on episodes of Top of the Pops. He later made an appearance in Never Mind the Buzzcocks, Stars in Their Eyes and RI:SE. While with the group they managed to score four Top 20 singles in their two-year career.

Dawson appeared along with Darren Day in a production of Joseph and the Amazing Technicolor Dreamcoat at the Palace Theatre, Manchester, UK. As a teenager, he appeared in a number of amateur productions in his home town, including Wilmslow Guild Players' production of Jack and the Beanstalk in 1996, for which he was nominated for The Barry Phillips Award for the Most Promising Youngster (Male) in the Cheshire Theatre Guild Awards.

In September 2013, Dawson was announced as a contestant on the eleventh series of  Strictly Come Dancing partnered with Ola Jordan. They were voted out in the quarter-finals, on 8 December.

In 2014, Dawson released "Playboy Bunny" on Applique Music, produced by Artful and Lempo, reached #1 on JunoDownload and #54 on ITunes, supported on Capital FM and BBC Radio One.

In January 2021, Dawson and John Junior, filmed a video with BBC Radio 5, about a suicide storyline in Hollyoaks. The storyline; When Nancy and Darren, played by Dawson, were distressed about Nancy's partner Kyle taking his own life, this stopped Junior from continuing with his suicide plans. The BBC brought them both together, so that Junior could thank Dawson for saving his life.

Filmography

Radio

Personal life
In January 2011, Dawson announced that he and long-term partner Karen McKay were expecting their first child. Their first son was born in March 2011 and their second in October 2013.

Dawson is fond of sports and plays football, tennis, and basketball. He supports Manchester United FC and considered a career as a professional footballer. He currently plays occasional charity football matches with the Hollyoaks All-Stars. He also owns a night club in Wilmslow called Symposium.

Awards and nominations

References

External links
 
Ashley Taylor Dawson at Biogs.com

1982 births
Living people
English male singers
English pop singers
English male stage actors
English male television actors
Allstars (band) members
National Youth Theatre members
People from Wilmslow
21st-century English singers
21st-century British male singers